Statute of Frauds and the Doctrine of Consideration (1937) Cmnd 5449 was a report by the Law Revision Committee on the consideration and formality in English contract law and other areas. It did not recommend abolition of the doctrine of consideration but made a series of recommendations to overturn the existing restrictions that had been developed by some common law courts.

Overview
The Law Revision Committee recommend the following transactions should be binding per se.

promises in writing
promises for past consideration
promises to accept part payments of debt to discharge the whole
promising to do what one is already bound to do
firm offers, where it is open for a period
promises detrimentally relied on by the promise, where the promisor should have known reliance would happen

See also
English contract law
English trusts law

Notes

English contract law